Statistics of the Scottish Football League in season 1899–1900.

Overview
Rangers were champions of the Scottish Division One.

Partick Thistle won the Scottish Division Two.

Scottish League Division One

Scottish League Division Two

See also
1899–00 in Scottish football

References

 
1899-1900